The following is an overview of the characters who appeared in the 1966–1968 live-action Batman television series.

Recurring cast and characters

Main characters

Supporting characters

Guest

Antagonist characters

Recurring

Guest 
{| class="wikitable"
|-
! style="width:145px;"| Character
! style="width:130px;"| Actor
! |Description
! style="width:130px;"|Episode Appearances
|- style="vertical-align:top;"
| 
| Art Carney
| By company records, the Archer was created specifically for the series by writer Stanley Ralph Ross and not related to the previous comic book character of the same name.

The character is presented as a skewed version of Robin Hood, with his group reflecting the Merry Men motif and consisting of female assistant Maid Marilyn and henchmen Big John, Crier Tuck, Allan A. Dale, and an assortment of poor people.

The Archer, among other characters created for the series, was adapted for a 2009 episode of the animated television series Batman: The Brave and the Bold.
|35 & 36
|- style="vertical-align:top;"
| 
| Tallulah Bankhead
| An original character created for the series, Black Widow is a bank robber who uses a spider motif where her henchmen were named after different types of spiders like Tarantula, Daddy Longlegs, and Trap Door. No actual origin is provided in the series.

The Black Widow, among other characters created for the series, was adapted for a 2009 episode of the animated television series Batman: The Brave and the Bold.
|89 & 90
|- style="vertical-align:top;"
| 
| Roddy McDowall
| An original character created for the series, Bookworm bases his crimes on books and literary tropes. His moll is Lydia Limpet and his henchmen are based on different things associated with books like Pressman, Printer's Devil, Typesetter, and Worm.

The Bookworm, among other characters created for the series, was adapted for a 2009 episode of the animated television series Batman: The Brave and the Bold.

Bookworm appeared in Batman vs. Two-Face, voiced by Jeff Bergman.

McDowall would later narrate the audiobook edition of the 1989 film and provide the voice of the Mad Hatter on Batman: The Animated Series.
|29 & 30

|- style="vertical-align:top;"
| 
| Liberace
| An original character created for the series, Chandell is a pianist who is blackmailed into a life of crime as the criminal Fingers by his twin brother Harry upon Chandell using a player piano in his White House performance after he hurt his hands. Harry's henchmen consist of the Piano Movers and both of them have female associates named Doe, Rae, and Mimi.

Chandell, among other characters created for the series, was adapted for a 2009 episode of the animated television series Batman: The Brave and the Bold.
|49 & 50

|- style="vertical-align:top;"
| 
| Barbara Rush
| Nora Clavicle was created specifically for the series. She is presented as a women's rights activist who attempts to destroy Gotham City in order to collect on an insurance policy she had taken out on it. She and her henchwomen Evelina and Angelina manipulated Mayor Linseed's wife Millie in order to have the mayor replace Commissioner Gordon with her and all the male police officers with women.
|113
|- style="vertical-align:top;"
| 
| Walter Slezak
| Based on the comic book character of the same name, no origin for the character is provided within the series. His female assistant is Millie Second and his henchmen are Second Hand Three and Second Hand Five.

In Batman '66, he is revealed to be the Mad Hatter's brother Morris Tetch.
|45 & 46
|- style="vertical-align:top;"
| 
| Malachi Throne 
| Based on the Silver Age version of the comic book character of the same name, no origin for the character is provided within the series. His female assistant was Blaze and his henchmen are Burns, Brinks, Pinkerton, Hugh, and Little Tom.

In Batman '66, False Face's true identity is Basil Karlo, where the issue that revealed this identity had him becoming that comic series' version of Clayface.

This version of False Face was adapted for a 2009 episode of the animated television series Batman: The Brave and the Bold, voiced by Corey Burton.
|17 & 18
|- style="vertical-align:top;"
| 
| Rudy Vallee
| Ffogg was created specifically for the series. He is presented as an upper-class member of Londinium society who runs a school for thieves and uses homemade fog to cover up his crimes. Often assisting him in his criminal doings was his sister Lady Penelope Peasoup (Glynis Johns), his butler Basil, his chauffeur Digby, and his footman Scudder.
|105-107
|- style="vertical-align:top;"
| 
| Roger C. Carmel
| Gumm was created specifically for the series. He is presented as a stamp factory foreman who is using the company to produce forged stamps in the episodes featuring the Green Hornet and Kato. Batman didn't know about Gumm's illegal activities until Green Hornet and Kato showed up in Gotham City. His henchmen are Block, Cancelled, and Reprint.
|85 & 86
|- style="vertical-align:top;"
| 
| Ethel Merman
| Lola Lasagne was created specifically for the series. She is presented as a childhood friend of the Penguin's who owns a racehorse, the only thing her ex husband Luigi left her when he disappeared. The pair use the horse in a racing scam. She and Penguin had Visor and Armband as their mutual henchmen.
|98 & 99
|- style="vertical-align:top;"
| 
| Milton Berle
| Louie was created specifically for the series and was presented as a gangster using a flower motif. He is a gangster who plotted to take over the minds of Gotham City's "flower generation" with help from his female assistant Lila and his henchmen Acacia, Arbutus, Azalea, and Petunia. In his second appearance, Louie plotted to corner the perfume market with help from perfume expert Lotus and henchmen Saffron and Sassafrass that also involved kidnapping Bruce Wayne and have him cut out the scene pouches of the stolen Abyssinian civet cats, beavers, musk deer, and muskrats.

Louie the Lilac, among other characters created for the series, was adapted for a 2009 episode of the animated television series Batman: The Brave and the Bold.
|101 & 112
|- style="vertical-align:top;"
| 
| Shelley Winters
| Ma Parker was created specifically for the series. She is presented as an elderly woman and master criminal who runs a gang consisting of her and her children Pretty Boy Parker, Machine Gun Parker, Mad Dog Parker, and Legs Parker. She allows herself to be captured so that she can take over Gotham State Penitentiary and form a gang from its inmates.

Ma Parker, among other characters created for the series, was adapted for a 2009 episode of the animated television series Batman: The Brave and the Bold’'.

The name is a play on the infamous criminal Ma Barker, whom Winters herself later played in the film Bloody Mama.
|43 & 44
|- style="vertical-align:top;"
| 
| Carolyn Jones
| Marsha was created specifically for the series. When originally introduced, she plots to gain access to the diamond that powers the Batcomputer. Marsha has an aunt named Aunt Hilda who thinks she's a witch. She later collaborated with the Penguin in a movie plot.
|57, 58 & 76-78
|- style="vertical-align:top;"
| 
| Zsa Zsa Gabor
| Minerva was created specifically for the series. She is introduced as a spa owner catering to Gotham City's wealthy. Minerva uses a modified hair dryer to scan her client's minds to find out where they hide their fortunes with help from her henchmen Aphrodite, Adonis, Apollo, and Atlas.
|120
|- style="vertical-align:top;"
| 
| Van Johnson
| The Minstrel was created specifically for the series and was presented as a genius in the field of electrical engineering and styled himself as a medieval troubadour. His group consists of Octavia, Treble, Bass, Mellow, and Dulcet.
|39 & 40
|- style="vertical-align:top;"
| 
| Lesley Gore
| A henchwoman of the Catwoman's, she is a rock singer with a crush on Robin. The Catwoman manipulates Pussycat into turning Robin against Batman involving her Cataphrenic drug.
| 74 & 75
|- style="vertical-align:top;"
| 
| Maurice Evans
| Based on the comic book character of the same name, no origin for the character is provided within the series. He attempts to steal the "Retsoor", a supersonic plane owned by Artemis Knab. He is assisted by Rocket O'Rourke (portrayed by Barbara Stuart), Blimpy, Glider, and Ramjet.

The season two episodes where the Puzzler appeared were originally written for the Riddler and were going to be called "A Penny For Your Riddles" and "They're Worth A Lot More". Due to Frank Gorshin holding out over salary issues and no longer wanting to play the Riddler, the scripts were re-written and Evans cast in the role.
|65 & 66
|- style="vertical-align:top;"
| 
| Michael Rennie
| This version of the Sandman was created specifically for the series and is unrelated to the Golden Age comic book character of the same name. Presented as an international criminal who uses hypnotic sand to control sleepwalkers, he partners with the Catwoman and uses the alias Doctor Somnambula in an attempt to steal J. Pauline Spaghetti's fortune. Sandman's henchmen are Nap and Snooze.
|67 & 68
|- style="vertical-align:top;"
| 
| Joan Collins
| The Siren was created specifically for the series. She is presented as Lorelei Circe, a chanteuse who is able to sing notes so high that they place men under her control. While briefly helping out Riddler, Siren went on to her own plan to deal with Batman that involved controlling Commissioner Gordon. She was assisted in that plot by Allegro and Andante.

The Siren, among other characters created for the series, was adapted for a 2009 episode of the animated television series Batman: The Brave and the Bold.

The Siren appeared in issue #2 of Batman '66 where she collaborated with Chandell.
|96 & 97
|- style="vertical-align:top;"
| 
| Ida Lupino
| Dr. Cassandra Spellcraft was created specifically for the series. She is presented as a world-famous alchemist, occultist, and criminal who is seeking to do things that her fore-mothers have failed at. Making use of camouflage pills, Dr. Spellcraft and her husband Cabala (portrayed by Howard Duff) planned to take over Gotham City that involved springing Joker, Penguin, Riddler, Catwoman, King Tut, and Egghead (all portrayed by uncredited stand-ins) from Gotham State Penitentiary so that they can do heists in exchange for 50% of the profits.
|119
|- style="vertical-align:top;"
| 
| Anne Baxter
| Zelda was created specifically for the series. She is shown to be a world-famous magician and escape artist who once a year pulls off a major robbery to pay Eivol Ekdol for the equipment she uses in her act.
|9 & 10
|}

 "Batclimb" cameos 
Aside from the super-criminals, another coveted spot was the Batclimb Cameo. In 14 episodes of the first two seasons and the 1966 film, a window would be opened by a celebrity for a short conversation as the Dynamic Duo scaled a building using Batarangs and Bat-ropes. The scenes were actually filmed on a horizontal surface with the camera rotated by 90 degrees to give the illusion that the Duo were on a vertical wall. Their capes were held up by strings (usually off-camera, but on occasion visible). The Batclimb cameo scenes were discontinued for the third season.

 Jerry Lewis – appeared in "The Bookworm Turns" (April 20, 1966).
 George Cisar – drunkard (in the theatrical feature released July 30, 1966).
 Dick Clark – appeared in "Shoot a Crooked Arrow" (September 7, 1966).
 Van Williams and Bruce Lee as Green Hornet and Kato – Appeared in "The Spell of Tut" (September 28, 1966).
 Sammy Davis Jr. – appeared in "The Clock King's Crazy Crimes" (October 12, 1966).
 Bill Dana as José Jiménez from The Bill Dana Show – appeared in "The Yegg Foes in Gotham" (October 20, 1966).
 Howard Duff as Sam Stone from Felony Squad – appeared in "The Impractical Joker" (November 16, 1966).
 Werner Klemperer as Colonel Klink from Hogan's Heroes – appeared in "It's How You Play the Game" (December 1, 1966).
 Ted Cassidy as Lurch from The Addams Family'' – appeared in "The Penguin's Nest" (December 7, 1966).
 Don Ho – appeared in "The Bat's Kow Tow" (December 15, 1966).
 Andy Devine as Santa Claus – appeared in "The Duo is Slumming" (December 22, 1966).
 Art Linkletter – appeared in "Catwoman Goes to College" (February 22, 1967).
 Edward G. Robinson – appeared in "Batman's Satisfaction" (March 2, 1967).
 Suzy Knickerbocker (pen name of Aileen Mehle) – appeared in "King Tut's Coup" (March 8, 1967).
 Cyril Lord as the Carpet King – appeared in "Ice Spy" (March 29, 1967).

References

External links
 Batman TV Series, 1966-68, IMDb Complete Cast List
 Bat-Mania UK :: 1966 Batman
 Heroes
 Villains

.Characters
Television series characters
Lists of American crime television series characters
Lists of DC Comics television characters